Burton Township is the smallest of 17 townships in McHenry County, Illinois. As of the 2020 census, its population was 4,820 and it contained 1,858 housing units.

Burton Township was first settled by Englishmen in 1836 who gave it the name English Prairie.  Later settlers called the township Benton, but after learning that there already was a post office and township of Benton in southern Illinois, the name was changed to Burton on December 28, 1850. Burton Township is unusually small because its first residents broke from Richmond Township to its west. The reason for this was a "Hatfields vs. McCoys" type of feud in the 1840s over alleged township mismanagement and higher taxes in Richmond.

The Burton settlers opted out and even tried to have adjoining Lake County absorb them into its eastern neighbor, Antioch Township, but Antioch Township had just consolidated Cooper Township into itself, and since Burton Township was situated in another county, a special law needed to be passed in Springfield to affect that change.  [Curiously, Abraham Lincoln successfully represented the disgruntled residents of what would become Niantic Township Niantic Township, Macon County, Illinois to join downstate Macon County to escape the higher taxation of Shelby and Sangamon Counties in the late 1830s. Lincoln's fee was set at 7 and 1/2 percent of each landholder's tax saving for the first three years .... a fee gratefully paid by nearly all of the township's 'secessionists.'  This episode was used by various Southern orators and newspapers, and their Northern sympathizers, to show Lincoln's inconsistency and hypocrisy in demanding that the Southern States could not secede from the Union after Fort Sumter, when he himself had argued that the Niantic settlers could "pick up and leave the rottenness of Shelby and Sangamon Counties as they saw fit, a God-given right of self-determination."  ]

Geography

Demographics

References

External links
Census information
History of Burton, Il.

Townships in McHenry County, Illinois
Townships in Illinois